Uzan Bazar is a residential and commercial centre of Guwahati and one of the oldest settlements in the city. It is located in the northern part of the city with the river Brahmaputra flowing alongside in north. It houses some of the major tourist as well as sites of regional importance in and around its area.
This area is the nearest of the residential areas as far as the river is concerned, is famous for its fish market of fished out varieties from the river.

Etymology
The name Uzan Bazar comes from the Kamrupi word Uzan, which refers to old settlement in the area located in upstream of river Brahmaputra. This area served as a major river port in earlier times.

Place of interest

Uzan Bazar Barowari Puja Mandap
This community establishment is a major prayer hall for the locals of Uzan Bazar. An annual Durga Puja attracts a major crowd during the festival. This mandap(prayer hall in Assamese), is also a common venue of Hindu marriage ceremonies, sacred thread (Upanayan) ceremonies and various traditional auspicious family events and functions for the Guwahatians. The prayer hall in return lends its name Barowari ( meaning which belong to the community in Assamese) to the place in and around it.

Happy Villa
Happy Villa is a locality in Uzan Bazar. The area is just near to Barowari Chowk which is near the Uzan Bazar Barowari Puja Mandap. It is one of the oldest settlements in Guwahati where many old families and eminent personalities reside.

The area has three major Roads,
1. Boloram Bora (BRB) Road which starts from the Barowari Chowk (west) and continues straight through the Kamrup Byam Samiti/ Happy Villa LP School point to the Navagraha Hillside (east)
2. Satya Bora (SB) Road which starts at the point of Kamrup Byam Samiti/ Happy Villa LP School and continues through the Gyan Ashram/ Purabi Kunti to the Kharguli side (north)
3. Col. Sivaram Bora (SRB) Road which starts near (before the starting of) Navagraha Hills from BRB Road and continues to the Kharguli side (north)

The area falls under Silpukhuri Sub Post Office (781003) except the Kharguli side which is under Kharguli Sub Post Office (781004)

Being at the heart of the city of Guwahati, it is highly preferred for stays and therefore with the age-old houses, one can observe new apartments being built and even with high prices its demand never falls.

Rajbari
Rajbari is one of the most historically important places within Guwahati. It was the bed of the Ahom Kingdom in Lower Assam. The descendant families of the Ahom Kings still live in that area of the city. It is situated in the banks of river Brahmaputra and located in the current road leading to Raj Bhawan (Governor's House). Currently, there are more than 15 families belonging to the erstwhile Ahom Kingdom residing within the Rajbari compound. Many of the families have shifted out to Zoo Road Tiniali - Gitanagar area of the city. The remnants of Kareng (Palace) of the Ahom Kingdom is situated within the compound of Rajbari. The original Kareng was destroyed in the great Assam earthquake of 1897. However, later the British East India Company constructed a new residence to house the royal family. This structure is still preserved at Rajbari with descendants of the royal family residing in it. The royal temple is located within the compound which now serves as Naamghar for the extended families residing within Rajbari and in other parts of the city.

Jor Pukhuri
Jor means 'a pair' in Assamese and Pukhri/Pukhuri stands for 'pond'. Jor Pukhuri is a pair of ponds which adds up to the residential value of the area. The two ponds, which was earlier just one became a pair when the canal connecting the Brahmaputra to the temple of Ugratara, a prominent centre of Shakti Puja, in the times of Koch rulers was sealed and converted into a road called the Naujaan Road. Naujaan in Assamese means a canal for boats. The water of the ponds has an under source with the river Brahmaputra. Apart from the legendary significance, this set of ponds depicts affinity to water for the earliest settlers of Guwahati in and around the pond surroundings. Moreover, it serves as an excellent nesting grounds for various Herons, Egrets and Cranes in the trees in its boundary. The pond, since a very long time, is the home to a gaggle of Whooper Swans (Cygnus cygnus), Raj Haanh in Assamese, and their various humanly antics have become figs of various folklore and poetry of Assam.

Latasil
Latasil is a playground in the Uzan Bazar. The playground, which is a permanent venue for Bihu and Durga Puja celebrations, has donated its name to the area as well. The playground also serves as a coaching centre and practice ground for various cricket and football clubs.

Maas Ghat
Maas Ghat, Assamese for 'Fish Port' is a small thatched market area famous for its fresh river fishes. In the wee hours of the day, the market comes to its fullest of life. One can hear the loud auction cries of the whole sellers locally known as Mohol(wholesale) owners, inviting bids from the fish sellers. Though people thronging the place for their own direct consumption could also be seen in the market as the local people are avid fish consumers.

Daily market
Uzan Bazar happens to be one of the busiest of the daily-needs market in the city. This market lends its name to the whole area with which it is known. Apart from value stores, department stores, groceries, confectionery, meat sellers, fishmongers, bakeries, eateries and food joints, the market earns a good repute from the womenfolk for its wide availability of Ladies Tailors, a set of kiosks famed for their self-acclaimed proficiency in stitching women's garments, especially churidars and salwar kameez, a traditional North Indian attire now happily owned by the Assamese women folk as well. Besides these shops and commercial establishments, the Market area also nestles a Guwahati Municipality Corporation's branch office and a Post Office of the Indian Post.

Kachari Bazar
This market gets its name from the nearby placed Guwahati High Court and the District Court. Kachari in Assamese means Court. However, apart from the name, which is a misnomer, the market is a typical Assamese countryside market, within the city. The market is frequented by the people even from the farthest corner of the city due to the market's reputation of selling exotic Assamese fruits and vegetables.

Vivekananda Kendra
Guwahati's branch of Vivekananda Kendra is in Uzan Bazar. It is a non-profit organisation run by the Vivekananda Trust of India which serves as a centre of Yoga and Cultural and spiritual studies. Apart from these major places, it is also the home to a number of a literary and cultural activist of Assam. It is perhaps due to this that, Kumar Bhaskar Natya Mandir - a regular cultural venue for various city events in Guwahati, is present in Uzan Bazar. A children library, Bishnu Nirmala Xhixu Poothibhnoraal, serves as a perfect reading place for the local kids. Amongst the teenagers and young adults, Uzan Bazar serves a perfect spot for recreational activities alongside its riverbank. This riverbank is further ornamented with a park, consisting of a jogging track and offers a beautiful view of the Brahmaputra river. The Guwahati Planetarium is in Uzan Bazar, north of the Latasil field. The Guwahati High Court is also in the Uzan Bazar area.

Education
Government Primary Schools, Government High Schools and a few nursery and kindergartens are run by locals and business houses.
An MBA institute ISBM-G affiliated to Dibrugarh University offering courses for MBA, BBA, and BCA. There was also a Tata Institute of Social Science (TISS) Branch in Uzan Bazar recently opened in 2013 imparting social science knowledge to interested students from all over the country. The TISS branch has now been shifted to Jalukbari, Guwahati as it is the Permanent Campus. Innumerable scholars and artists settled and lived their lives in this area, and hence, Uzan Bazar is often regarded as the heart of Guwahati.

Accommodation
Nearby hotels are Hotel Brahmaputra Ashok, Hotel Blue Moon and Hotel Belle Vue.

Transportation
Uzan Bazar's postal code is 781001 and Lamb Road, M.C. Road, F.C. Road and M.G.Road are nearby city roads. The area is well connected with the rest of the city through the city buses, auto-rickshaws, cycle rickshaws, Trekkers-shared taxi service and other modes of transportation.

See also

References

Neighbourhoods in Guwahati